Sasha Mitchell (born July 27, 1967) is an American actor best known for his television roles as James Beaumont on Dallas and Cody Lambert on Step by Step as well as playing David Sloane in three installments of the original Kickboxer franchise. Mitchell has a black belt in taekwondo.

Personal life
Mitchell was born on 27 July 1967 in Los Angeles, California, the son of a garment manufacturer. Mitchell is Jewish, with Russian origins. In 1990, he married Jeannette Robbins. The two had four children together before divorcing in 1997.

During Mitchell's marriage to Robbins, police were called to the couple's home to investigate reports of domestic abuse. In 1996, Mitchell was convicted of misdemeanor battery, spousal abuse and child endangerment stemming from an altercation with his wife. He was given three years’ probation and ordered to perform community service and attend counseling classes for spousal abusers. After violating his probation, he was sentenced to 30 days in jail. In 2002, Mitchell spoke of the incident on Entertainment Tonight, claiming that he was protecting his children from his ex-wife, who was addicted to drugs at the time of the arrests. Mitchell ended up getting custody of their four children, with his ex-wife given limited visitation.

In December 2010, Mitchell married his second wife Rachel, also known as Sharmaine Rayner. He filed for divorce in spring 2015.

Career
Prior to acting, Mitchell was often used as a model for Bruce Weber's fashion photography.

From 1989 to 1991, Mitchell appeared on the hit CBS prime time soap opera Dallas, as James Beaumont, the illegitimate first-born son of J. R. Ewing and his long-ago girlfriend Vanessa Beaumont. He made guest appearances on other series, including Rags to Riches.

He had the title role in the 1988 film Spike of Bensonhurst and in 1994's Class of 1999 II: The Substitute. He starred in Kickboxer 2: The Road Back and the third and fourth installments of the film series. He also appeared in a 3 Musketeers commercial in 1989.

His best-known role came on the ABC sitcom Step by Step, where he played Cody Lambert, the nephew of actor Patrick Duffy's character Frank Lambert. Duffy had also played the uncle of Mitchell's character on Dallas. Mitchell's character Cody was based on his personal life experiences.

In the early 2000s, Mitchell acted in several films and made guest appearances on JAG, NYPD Blue, and ER.

Filmography

References

External links
 
 

1967 births
Living people
20th-century American male actors
21st-century American male actors
Male actors from California
American male film actors
American people of Russian-Jewish descent
American male television actors
Jewish American male actors
People convicted of domestic violence
People from Greater Los Angeles
American male taekwondo practitioners
21st-century American Jews